Iodine pentoxide is the chemical compound with the formula I2O5.  This iodine oxide is the anhydride of iodic acid, and the only stable oxide of iodine.  It is produced by dehydrating iodic acid at 200 °C in a stream of dry air:

2HIO3 → I2O5 + H2O

Structure 
I2O5 is bent with an I–O–I angle of 139.2°, but the molecule has no mirror plane so its symmetry is C2 rather than C2v. The terminal I–O distances are around 1.80 Å and the bridging I–O distances are around 1.95 Å.

Reactions 
Iodine pentoxide easily oxidises carbon monoxide to carbon dioxide at room temperature:

5 CO + I2O5 → I2 + 5 CO2

This reaction can be used to analyze the concentration of CO in a gaseous sample.

I2O5 forms iodyl salts, [IO2+], with SO3 and S2O6F2, but iodosyl salts, [IO+], with concentrated sulfuric acid.

Iodine pentoxide decomposes to iodine (vapor) and oxygen when heated to about 350 °C.

References

Iodine compounds
Oxides
Acidic oxides
Oxidizing agents